I'm Serious is the debut studio album by American rapper T.I., released on October 9, 2001 through Arista Records.

The album included guests appearances from Pharrell Williams of The Neptunes (who called T.I. "the Jay-Z of the South"), Jazze Pha, Too Short, Bone Crusher, Lil Jon, Mac Boney, Pastor Troy, P$C and Youngbloodz. The album featured production from DJ Toomp, Craig Love, Maseo, Brian Kidd, The Neptunes, Jazze Pha, Yung D, Lil Jon and T.I. himself.

Despite the album's guests appearances and production team, the album peaked at #98 on the U.S. Billboard 200 chart, and only sold over 165,000 copies in the United States. Upon its release, critics pointed to the fact that many of the tracks sounded the same and that a few were blatant rip-offs. Other critics commented saying, "T.I. claims to be the king of the South, but fails to show and prove. He does, however, have potential. If his talent ever matches his confidence, he may just be headed for stardom."

Due to the poor commercial reception of the album, T.I. asked for a joint venture deal with Arista Records or be released from his contract; he was subsequently dropped from the label.

Background
T.I. was born Clifford Joseph Harris Jr. on September 25, 1980, in Atlanta, Georgia, the son of the late Clifford "Buddy" Harris Sr. and Violeta Morgan. He was raised by his grandparents in Bankhead, Atlanta, Georgia. His father lived in New York City and he would often go up there to visit him. His father suffered from Alzheimer's and later died from the disease. T.I. was interested in rap music at the young age of seven, and found that he could entertain his relatives and feel included. T.I. began rapping at age nine. He was making demos of his music by age ten or eleven. He attended Douglass High School, but later dropped out. As a teenager, he was a drug dealer. By age 14, he had been arrested several times. He was nicknamed "Tip" after his paternal great-grandfather. Upon signing with Arista Records in 1999, he shortened his name to T.I. out of respect for label mate Q-Tip.

The title track, "I'm Serious". was released on June 26, 2001 and failed to make the Billboard Hot 100. The song was produced by The Neptunes and it features Beenie Man. The song  had very little airplay and failed to chart. The label declined to release a second single; however, T.I. created a video for "Dope Boyz" that was released to YouTube.

Critical reception

Upon its release, I'm Serious received positive reviews from most music critics. Some critics, however, pointed to the fact that many of the tracks sounded the same and that a few were blatant rip-offs. AllMusic writer Jon Azpiri wrote "T.I. claims to be the king of the South, but on I'm Serious he fails to show and prove. He does, however, have potential. If his talent ever matches his confidence, he may be headed for stardom." Down-South gave the album a four out of five stars saying "With his solo finally about to drop, this album should be his gateway into the mainstream arena. Overall, this album is all I expected plus more. I don't seen how anyone couldn't like it because it's  so much diversity. So when you see this album on store shelves, be sure to grab it, you won't be disappointed."

HipHopDX wrote "Lyrically, Atlanta-bred T.I. (TIP to kids around the way) isn't far behind a lot of other gifted young cats tryin' to make it in the rap game. But rather than doing stand-up on the mic or seeing how many words he can rhyme with Versaci, this 20-year-old tells wonderfully-detailed stories on I'm Serious about coming up when all the elements try to keep you down. But T.I.'s at his best when he uses his head and not his, well, head. Similarly, I'm Serious gets it done by talking about familiar hip hop topics (gats, girls and makin' green), but doing it in a way that somehow comes off as fresh and original." Rhapsody writer Sam Chennault wrote "The opening salvo from one of Southern hip-hop's most charismatic emcees, I'm Serious is more introspective and less bombastic than T.I.'s subsequent work. "Still Ain't Forgave Myself" and "What Happened" are surprisingly tender, though "Dope Boyz" and the Neptunes-produced "What's Your Name" set the stage for the emergence of T.I.'s playa/pusha persona."

Commercial performance
I'm Serious was released on October 9, 2001 through Arista Records in the United States. In its first week of release, I'm Serious made its debut on the Billboard 200 albums chart at number 98, and it debuted at number 27 on the Top R&B/Hip-Hop Albums chart. The album only sold 163,000 copies in the United States. Due to the poor commercial reception of the album, T.I. was dropped from Arista Records.

Track listing

Sample credits
"I Chooz U" contains a sample of "I Can Sho' Give You Love" as performed by Willie Hutch.

Personnel
Credits for I'm Serious adapted from Allmusic.

 Beenie Man – performer
 Josh Butler – engineer
 Andrew Coleman – engineer
 Myrna Crenshaw – vocals (background)
 DJ Toomp – producer
 Jay Goin – mixing
 Robert Hannon – mixing
 Troy Hightower – mixing
 Chad Hugo – arranger
 Dave "DasKyz" Hummel – engineer

 James Humphreys – assistant engineer
 Ken Ifill – mixing
 Jazze Pha – performer
 Craig Love – guitar
 Charles Pettaway – producer
 Matt Still – engineer, mixing
 Too Short – performer
 Pharrell Williams – arranger
 Mike "Hitman" Wilson – engineer

Charts

References

External links
 I'm Serious at Discogs

2001 debut albums
T.I. albums
Albums produced by DJ Toomp
Albums produced by Jazze Pha
Albums produced by Lil Jon
Albums produced by the Neptunes
Arista Records albums